The 2017 season was Micheál Donoghue's second year as manager of the Galway senior hurling team.	

On 3 September 2017, Galway beat Waterford in the All-Ireland Final where they won their first title since 1988.	

During the championship, Galway only scored two goals, both of which came in the first game against Dublin.

2017 senior hurling management team
Manager: Micheál Donoghue (Clarinbridge)
Selectors: Francis Forde (Turloughmore), Noel Larkin (Meelick-Eyrecourt)

2017 squad

Squad as per Galway v Tipperary, 2017 All-Ireland Senior Hurling Championship Semi-Final, 6 August 2017

2017 Walsh Cup

2017 National Hurling League

2017 Leinster Senior Hurling Championship

2017 All-Ireland Senior Hurling Championship

Awards
On 2 November, the 2017 PwC All-Stars winners were announced with Galway picking up seven awards. 

 Padraic Mannion (Galway) 
 Daithí Burke (Galway)
 Gearóid McInerney (Galway) 
 David Burke (Galway)
 Joe Canning (Galway) 
 Conor Whelan (Galway) 
 Conor Cooney (Galway) 

On 3 November 2017 at the presentation of the All-Star awards, Joe Canning was named as the All Stars Hurler of the Year with Conor Whelan named the All Stars Young Hurler of the Year.

References

External links
Galway GAA Official Site

Galway